The World Museum was a full-page illustrated feature in some American Sunday newspapers, starting on May 9, 1937 until January 30, 1938. Devised and drawn by Holling Clancy Holling (1900–1973), it was also known as The World Museum Dioramas.

The Evening Star in Washington and the Baltimore American both published the dioramas. Publication in the Evening Star abruptly stops in February 1938 in spite of the next diorama, Log Cabin Days (scheduled for February 6, 1938) being announced in the January 30, 1938 issue along with Roman Gladiators. No announcement of the cancellation seems to have been done.

Format
Each diorama was published in the Sunday edition and occupied a full page in color. It featured all the parts to be cut out by the reader with detailed instructions to cut out the pictures and assemble them into a diorama using wrapping paper to stiffen the structure. Each new diorama had a paragraph explaining the diorama itself from a historical or geographical point of view. Subject included historical events, natural wonders or international ethnographic scenes.

List of Dioramas
These are the dioramas published from May 1937 to January 1938 the Washington, D.C. Evening Star. The names are the titles as published in the newspapers. Names in [ ] are clarification comments for titles that are not clear.

May 1937:
 The Coronation of King George the Sixth and Queen Elizabeth 
 Treasure Hunters of the Sea 
 Castles in Spain 
 Dragons that Walked on the Water [Viking Ship] 

June 1937:
 The Creeping Wall [Glacier] 
 The Indian Buffalo Hunters 
 The Working Elephant 
 Making a Motion Picture 

July 1937:
 When the Liberty Bell Rang 
 When Dinosaurs Roamed the Earth 
 Life in a Dutch Village 
 Tibetan Devil Dancers 

August 1937:
 China Clipper [A Small Plane] 
 Fulton's First Steamboat 
 Whale Hunting 
 African Waterhole 

September 1937:
 An Indian School 
 Perry's Victory [War of 1812] 
 Polish Village Festival 
 Balboa at the Pacific 

October 1937:
 The Ohio Mound Builders [Native Americans] 
 Discovery of America [Christopher Columbus] 
 Dancing Scotch Villagers 
 Interior of a Coal Mine 
 Indian False Faces [Native American Masks]

November 1937:
 The Pool of Death [A prehistoric tar pool in California] 
 A Lacrosse Game 
 First Thanksgiving 
 The Grand Canyon 

December 1937:
 Eskimo Life 
 Lion Spearing 
 Mexican Christmas 
 The Three Wise Men 

January 1938:
 Chinese New Year 
 First Bullfights 
 Siamese Temple 
 Roman Gladiators 
 American Desert 

February 1938:
 Log Cabin Days (Announced but unpublished)

References

External links
 Informative and exhaustive blog dedicated to Hollings' work.
 Guide to the Holling Clancy Holling papers at the University of Oregon
 Guide to the Holling Clancy Holling papers at the University of California Los Angeles

American comic strips
1937 comics debuts
Dioramas
Educational comics